Harry George Woodward (29 August 1919 – September 1984) was an English footballer who played as a centre half.

Career
Woodward began his career with Chelmsford City. In 1946, Woodward signed for Southend United. Over the course of six years, Woodward made 14 appearances for Southend in the Football League. After leaving Southend, Woodward had a spell with Tonbridge.

References

1919 births
1984 deaths
Association football defenders
English footballers
Footballers from Bromley
Chelmsford City F.C. players
Southend United F.C. players
Tonbridge Angels F.C. players
English Football League players